South Callaway R-II High School, most commonly known as South Callaway High School, South Callaway, SoCal, or SCHS, is a public high school located in Mokane, Missouri, United States. It provides education for students in grades 912. The school is part of the South Callaway R-II School District, all located on the same campus in Mokane, and is the only high school in the district. The school colors are blue and white. The school was opened in 1959.

Enrollment 
According to numbers at MSHSAA, the school currently enrolls 323 students from the surrounding communities in the southeast corner of the county, including Mokane, Steedman, Portland, Tebbetts, Hams Prairie, and Fulton. Other high schools in the county are comparable or larger in size, with New Bloomfield serving 209 students in the southwest, North Callaway serving 498 in the north, and Fulton with an enrollment of 796 in the Fulton area.

These numbers reflect enrollment data from the 2006-2007 school year, used to facilitate athletic classification.

Curriculum 
South Callaway offers a curriculum that includes standard subjects as well as varied electives for students. All classes listed in bold below are offered as dual credit courses through Central Methodist University.

Mathematics: basic math, applied math, Algebra I, geometry, Algebra II, math analysis, calculus
Language Arts: Language Arts 9, 10, and 11, survey of literature, speech, composition (English 103/104),  science fiction/fantasy
Science: general science, biology, General Biology, chemistry, physics, microbiology, anatomy/physiology
Social Studies: government, world history, American History, Development of the United States I and II, Missouri history, world geography, introduction to criminal justice, psychology/sociology
Fine Arts: band, chorus, art, drama
Practical Arts: keyboarding, computer technology, computer applications, accounting, notetaking, supervised work experience, horticulture, floriculture, agricultural science, energy, woodworking, drafting, catering, child development
Physical Education: PE, strength and conditioning, body conditioning, lifetime sports
Other: French, Spanish, special education courses, driver's education, economics, health

Athletics
The SCHS athletic teams are known as the Bulldogs, with girls' teams occasionally styled "Lady Bulldogs", most often in basketball. These teams, as well as the quiz bowl and speech teams, are members of the Eastern Missouri Conference, along with Tipton, North Callaway, Southern Boone, Harrisburg, and Hallsville.

Sports currently offered at South Callaway include the following. Class and district numbers are provided for those sports sanctioned by MSHSAA:

Seasons

Fall
Football - Class 2, District 5
Softball - Class 2, District 10
Cross Country - Class 2, District 3
Cheerleading
Drill Team
Winter
Basketball - Class 3, District 8
Cheerleading
Drill Team
Spring
Baseball - Class 2, District 8
Track and Field - Class 2, District 3
Golf - Class 2, District 5
Cheerleading

Football
The SCHS football team showed a dramatic improvement in the 200405 season due to the advent of a new weight training program implemented by the coaching staff. The varsity team went from a record of 19 in 2003 to, under head coach Bill Frazee, a 2004 record of 73, and a 64 record in 2005. The 2006 season, however, was a losing season at 010, due to a young inexperienced team. The 200708 team showed some improvements, going 28.

Track and field
The state Senate honored South Callaway's Eric Frazee for his first-place finish in the 300 meter intermediate hurdles at the state track meet in Jefferson City on May 17, 2008. Frazee is the first state champion, at any sport, from the school since its establishment.

Extracurricular activities

Competitions
 Quiz bowl - Class 3, District 4
 Math relays
 Speech team - Class 1, District 2
 Band - Class 3, District 9
Cheerleading

Quiz bowl
The quiz bowl team at SCHS is one of the most successful activities, having qualified for state competition 3 times in the past 10 years. The team, composed of members of all grades 912, narrowly missed state in 2005, losing to School of the Osage at district play. However, the team recoiled and the next year, beat Osage on their home turf to qualify for their first state play in 9 years and received 4th place at the state level. 2007 and 2008 saw the team beaten by Hallsville in the district championship matches.

Band
The band program at South Callaway includes three divisions: marching band, pep band, and concert band. Because of enrollment size, all band students perform in all three groups. The three seasons overlap extensively.

Marching band season typically lasts from August through December. The band participates in the Mokane World's Fair parade in September, and the Central Methodist University Band Day in October, as well as the Fulton Christmas parade in December. Standard dress is the marching band uniform, which consists of a black and blue jacket, with black pants and a white or black shako hat. Pep band season includes both football and basketball seasons. The band plays pep tunes in the stands at home games. Concert band season is the generally winter and spring session. Events include a winter concert, spring concert, the Music Festival at Central Methodist University, and a performance at the graduation ceremony in May. Often, spur of the moment concerts come up, and such instances in 2005-2006 included a performance at a bridge opening in Portland, Missouri, and a Veterans' Day assembly. The concert band also travels for the District and State music contest.

Clubs and organizations 

 FBLA
 FFA
 FCCLA
 FTA
 Student Council (STUCO)
 TREND
 Athletic Association
 French Club
 Spanish Club
 Fine Arts Club
 National Honor Society
 Jumpstart
 Renaissance Club

FBLA
The FBLA (Future Business Leaders of America) chapter at South Callaway is one of the largest and most active organizations in the district.  The chapter is active in fundraising and community awareness projects, benefitting tsunami victims, the American Cancer Society, the March of Dimes, and the surrounding communities. The chapter is also a winning one. Business teachers have guided the chapter to 15 consecutive victories at the District 2 Leadership Conference. The team also qualifies many members for state competition held in Columbia, Missouri in April. In 2006, SCHS' Website Development team qualified for the National Leadership Conference in Nashville, Tennessee, and received Top 15 honors.

TREND
TREND (Turning Resources and Energy in New Directions), SCHS' drug-free group, continues to be active in organizing alternative activities for the district. Each year, TREND hosts many assemblies, including one by Camfel Productions, as well as speakers who present drug awareness messages to the student body.

STUCO
The Student Council arranges homecoming and courtwarming activities, blood drives, spirit weeks, and other activities for the school. Generally, each organization and class is given one representative in the council, who shall report back to the club/class on STUCO activities.

Schedule 
SCHS operates on a 50-minute class schedule. There are two lunch shifts: A, from 11:14-11:39, with students attending 5th period from 11:43-12:33; and B, with students attending 5th period from 11:18-12:08, and eating lunch from 12:08-12:33.

School Rivals

Since North Callaway's founding in 1969, there has been a strong rivalry between the North and South Callaway school districts. Even though South Callaway has a strong rivalry with the North Callaway Thunderbirds, they are also rivals with the other area schools such as; Southern Boone Eagles, Tipton Cardinals, Hallsville Indians, and the Harrisburg Bulldogs.

References

External links 
 
 Official district site

Public high schools in Missouri
Schools in Callaway County, Missouri
Educational institutions established in 1959
1959 establishments in Missouri